The Mike Lee Stakes is the first leg of the "Big Apple Triple", a grouping of three races in New York state for New York .  A horse who wins all three of the Big Apple Triple wins the purse total of $400,000 plus a $250,000 bonus. The second leg is the New York Derby held at Finger Lakes Racetrack and the third leg is the Albany Stakes at the Saratoga Race Course. The series began in 1999.

The Mike Lee is held at Belmont Park in the spring and is open to three-year-olds of either gender running at 7 furlongs.  It currently offers a purse of $125,000.  Although it is not restricted to registered New York breds, due to the racing conditions, it's still not an open race.

This race was run as the New York City OTB Big Apple Handicap prior to 1988, but in 1989 was named for Mike Lee, the former sports editor with the Long Island Press for over 40 years. The race was run as the Mike Lee Handicap through 1995.

In 2008, Tin Cup Chalice won the first Big Apple Triple by taking the Albany Stakes, the New York Derby, and the Mike Lee Handicap.

Records
Time record: 
 7 furlongs – : Captain Serious, 1:20.99 (2014) (Mike Lee Stakes)
 7 furlongs  – : Clearly Now,  1:19.96 (2014) (Belmont Park track record at this distance)

Most wins by a jockey
 4 – Edgar S. Prado (2001, 2003, 2004, 2006)Most wins by a trainer: 3 – Michael E. Hushion (2013, 2014, 2017)
 3 – H. James Bond (2000, 2001, 2003)Most wins by an owner:'''
 3 – James F. Edwards (1984, 2000, 2001)

Past winners

References

Horse races in New York (state)
Belmont Park
Flat horse races for three-year-olds
Racing series for horses
1988 establishments in New York (state)
Recurring sporting events established in 1988